Romário Guilherme dos Santos (born 13 March 1992), simply known as Romário, is a Brazilian footballer who plays as a left back for Novorizontino.

Club career

Audax and loans
Born in Diadema, São Paulo, Romário began his career at Audax's youth setup. In the 2010 summer he was loaned to F.C. Porto, after a partnership between both clubs was established.

In July 2011 Romário returned to his parent club, and made his debut as a senior in the year's Copa Paulista. On 3 September of the following year he moved to Série A club Bahia, on loan until December.

Romário made his debut in the main category of Brazilian football on 5 September 2012, starting in a 0–0 home draw against Atlético Mineiro. He finished the campaign with three appearances, as his side narrowly avoided relegation.

Romário spent the start of 2013 on loan at Audax Rio.

Red Bull Brasil / Avaí
On 14 December 2013, after another spell at Audax, Romário signed for Red Bull Brasil. The following 7 May, after impressing with the side in the Campeonato Paulista, he joined Avaí, newly promoted to the main category.

Romário was an undisputed starter for the side, but still suffered relegation.

Atlético Goianiense
In January 2016, Romário signed for Atlético Goianiense until the end of the year. He featured regularly for Dragão during the year, acting as team captain during the latter stages of the campaign.

Romário scored his first professional goal on 30 August 2016, netting his team's second in a 2–2 home draw against Ceará.

Ceará
On 7 December 2016, Romário agreed to a one-year deal with Ceará.

Santos
On 31 October 2017, Santos president Modesto Roma Júnior announced that Romário agreed to a five-year deal with the club, effective as of 1 January. He was officially announced on 4 January 2018.

Romário made his debut for the club on 17 January 2018, starting in a 3–0 home win against Linense. After only two matches for the club, he returned to his previous side Ceará on 10 March, on loan until the end of the year. After being rarely used, he moved to Guarani also in a temporary deal until the end of the year.

On 2 January 2019, Romário was loaned to former club Red Bull until the end of the year's Paulistão. The loan was extended until the end of 2019 with Red Bull Bragantino when that club was formed due to the merger of Red Bull Brasil with Clube Atlético Bragantino.

On 12 July 2019, after failing to appear for RB in the second division, Romário moved to fellow league team Vila Nova also in a temporary deal. On 2 January of the following year, he was loaned to Mirassol for the entire 2020 Campeonato Paulista.

On 25 June 2020, Romário agreed to a loan deal at Cuiabá, until the end of the year's second division. After helping the club in their first-ever promotion, he moved to Coritiba, recently relegated to the second level, on loan until December 2021.

On 8 December 2021, still owned by Santos, Romário moved to fellow second division side Operário Ferroviário for the 2022 season.

Novorizontino
Romário left Operário on 31 March 2022, and moved to Novorizontino in the same category, after terminating his contract with Santos.

Career statistics

Honours
Ceará
Campeonato Cearense: 2017, 2018

References

External links

1992 births
Living people
Footballers from São Paulo (state)
Brazilian footballers
Association football defenders
Campeonato Brasileiro Série A players
Campeonato Brasileiro Série B players
Grêmio Osasco Audax Esporte Clube players
Esporte Clube Bahia players
Red Bull Brasil players
Avaí FC players
Atlético Clube Goianiense players
Ceará Sporting Club players
Santos FC players
Guarani FC players
Clube Atlético Bragantino players
Vila Nova Futebol Clube players
Mirassol Futebol Clube players
Cuiabá Esporte Clube players
Coritiba Foot Ball Club players
Operário Ferroviário Esporte Clube players
Grêmio Novorizontino players
People from Diadema